The XPEL 225 is a NASCAR Craftsman Truck Series race at Circuit of the Americas in Austin, Texas. The race was introduced in 2021 as one of four road course races on the Truck Series schedule.

XPEL holds the naming rights to the race. The inaugural event in 2021 was sponsored by Toyota and called the Toyota Tundra 225. The race, along with the NASCAR Xfinity Series' Pit Boss 250, is a support event to the NASCAR Cup Series' Texas Grand Prix.

Past winners

2022: Race extended due to NASCAR overtime.

Multiple winners (teams)

Manufacturer wins

References

External links
 

2021 establishments in Texas
Circuit of the Americas
NASCAR races at Circuit of the Americas
NASCAR Truck Series races
Annual sporting events in the United States